Erich Wildpret is a Venezuelan actor. He appeared in more than twenty films since 1989.

Selected filmography

References

External links 

Living people
Venezuelan male film actors
Year of birth missing (living people)